The 1914 Haskell Indians football team was an American football team that represented the Haskell Indian Institute (now known as Haskell Indian Nations University) as an independent during the 1914 college football season. In its fourth season under head coach A. R. Kennedy, Haskell compiled a 5–4 record and outscored opponents by a total of 200 to 89. Its victories included games against Texas A&M and LSU; its losses included games against Notre Dame, Texas, and Oklahoma.

Schedule

References

Haskell
Haskell Indian Nations Fighting Indians football seasons
Haskell Indians football